Jackson County is a county located in the U.S. state of Mississippi. As of the 2020 census, the population was 143,252, making it the fifth-most populous county in Mississippi. Its county seat is Pascagoula. The county was named for Andrew Jackson, general in the United States Army and afterward President of the United States.

Jackson County is included in the Pascagoula, MS Metropolitan Statistical Area. It is located at the southeastern tip of the state. The county has sandy soil and is in the Piney Woods area. It borders the state of Alabama on its east side.

The county was severely damaged by both Hurricane Camille in August 1969 and Hurricane Katrina on August 29, 2005, which caused catastrophic effects.

Geography
It is the largest county in Mississippi by total area.

Despite the county's name, Jackson County does not contain the City of Jackson, the latter is located in Hinds County.

Major highways

  Interstate 10
  U.S. Highway 90
  Mississippi Highway 57
  Mississippi Highway 63
  Mississippi Highway 609
  Mississippi Highway 611
  Mississippi Highway 613
  Mississippi Highway 614

Adjacent counties
 George County - north
 Mobile County, Alabama - east
 Harrison County - west
 Stone County - northwest

National protected areas
 De Soto National Forest (part)
 Grand Bay National Wildlife Refuge (part)
 Gulf Islands National Seashore (part)
 Mississippi Sandhill Crane National Wildlife Refuge

Demographics

2020 census

As of the 2020 United States census, there were 143,252 people, 56,323 households, and 38,007 families residing in the county.

2000 census
As of the census of 2000, there were 131,420 people, 47,676 households, and 35,709 families residing in the county. The population density was 181 people per square mile (70/km2). There were 51,678 housing units at an average density of 71 per square mile (27/km2). The racial makeup of the county was 75.35% White, 20.87% Black or African American, 0.33% Native American, 1.57% Asian, 0.04% Pacific Islander, 0.72% from other races, and 1.12% from two or more races. 2.14% of the population were Hispanic or Latino of any race.

There were 47,676 households, out of which 37.00% had children under the age of 18 living with them, 55.70% were married couples living together, 14.50% had a female householder with no husband present, and 25.10% were non-families. 20.80% of all households were made up of individuals, and 7.10% had someone living alone who was 65 years of age or older. The average household size was 2.72 and the average family size was 3.14.

In the county, the population was spread out, with 27.70% under the age of 18, 9.30% from 18 to 24, 29.80% from 25 to 44, 22.90% from 45 to 64, and 10.30% who were 65 years of age or older. The median age was 35 years. For every 100 females, there were 98.20 males. For every 100 females age 18 and over, there were 95.90 males.

The median income for a household in the county was $39,118, and the median income for a family was $45,091. Males had a median income of $32,996 versus $22,770 for females. The per capita income for the county was $17,768. About 10.50% of families and 12.70% of the population were below the poverty line, including 17.80% of those under age 18 and 12.10% of those age 65 or over.

Jackson County has the fifth highest per capita income in the State of Mississippi.

Public Safety
The Jackson County Sheriff's Office provides law enforcement services for communities in the county that do not have their own local law enforcement. These communities are known as Census-Designated Places, or CDPs.

Education
School districts in the county include:

The Jackson County School District serves the Hurley, Wade, Big Point, Three Rivers, Harleston, Vestry, Latimer, and Vancleave communities, along with St. Martin and a small portion of Escatawpa. The Pascagoula-Gautier School District serves Pascagoula and most of the City of Gautier. The Moss Point School District serves Moss Point and most of Escatawpa. The Ocean Springs School District serves Ocean Springs.

Communities

Cities
 Gautier
 Moss Point
 Ocean Springs
 Pascagoula (county seat)

Census-designated places

 Big Point
 Escatawpa
 Gulf Hills
 Gulf Park Estates
 Helena
 Hurley
 Latimer
 St. Martin
 Vancleave
 Wade

Unincorporated places

 East Moss Point
 Poticaw Landing

Ghost towns
 Brewton

Former census-designated places
 Hickory Hills, merged into city of Gautier

Politics

See also

 National Register of Historic Places listings in Jackson County, Mississippi
 L.N. Dantzler Lumber Company

References

External links
 Official Web Site of Jackson County, Mississippi

 
Mississippi counties
Pascagoula metropolitan area
1812 establishments in Mississippi Territory
Populated places established in 1812